The Research Organization for Nanotechnology and Material (ORNAMAT) is one of Research Organizations under the umbrella of the National Research and Innovation Agency (BRIN). On 24 January 2022, the formation of the agency is announced and to be formed on 1 February 2022. The organization is resulted from restructuration of Assessment and Application of Technology Research Organization-BPPT and Engineering Science Research Organization. ORNM formation is finalized on 1 March 2022 and is functional since 4 March 2022 with inauguration of its first head, Ratno Nuryadi.

Structure 
The structure of ORNAMAT is as follows:

 Office of the Head of ORNAMAT
 Research Center for Advanced Material
 Research Center for Metallurgy
 Research Center for Mining Technology
 Research Center for Quantum Physics
 Research Center for Chemistry
 Research Center for Photonics
 Research Center for Polymer Technology
 Research Groups

List of Heads

References 

Science and technology in Indonesia
Research institutes in Indonesia
2022 establishments in Indonesia
National Research and Innovation Agency